Georg Heinrich von Görtz, Baron of Schlitz (1668 – 19 February 1719), diplomat in Swedish service, was born in Holstein and educated at Jena.

Career 
He entered the Holstein-Gottorp service, and after the death of the duchess Hedwig Sophia, Charles XII of Sweden's sister, became very influential during the minority of her son Duke Charles Frederick. His earlier policy aimed at strengthening Holstein-Gottorp at the expense of Denmark. With this object, during Charles XII's stay at Altranstädt (1706–1707), he tried to divert the king's attention to the Holstein question, and six years later, when the Swedish commander, Magnus Stenbock, crossed the Elbe, Görtz rendered him as much assistance as was compatible with not openly breaking with Denmark, even going so far as to surrender the fortress of Tönning to the Swedes. Görtz next attempted to undermine the grand alliance against Sweden by negotiating with Russia, Prussia and Saxony for the purpose of isolating Denmark, or even of turning the arms of the allies against her, a task by no means impossible in view of the strained relations between Denmark and the tsar. The plan foundered, however, on the refusal of Charles XII to save the rest of his German domains by ceding Stettin to Prussia. Another simultaneous plan of procuring the Swedish crown for Duke Charles Frederick also came to nought. Görtz first suggested the marriage between the duke of Holstein and the tsarevna Anne of Russia, and negotiations were begun in  Saint Petersburg with that object.

Görtz was also prominently involved in negotiating the terms of Stenbock's surrender in the Siege of Tönning, 1713.

Charles XII 
On the arrival of Charles XII from Turkey at Stralsund in 1714, Görtz was the first to visit him, and emerged from his presence chief minister or "grand-vizier" as the Swedes preferred to call the bold and crafty satrap, whose absolute devotion to the Swedish king took no account of the intense wretchedness of the Swedish nation. Görtz, himself a man of uncommon audacity, seems to have been fascinated by the heroic element in Charles's nature and was determined, if possible, to save him from his difficulties. He owed his extraordinary influence to the fact that he was the only one of Charles's advisers who believed, or pretended to believe, that Sweden was still far from exhaustion, or at any rate had a sufficient reserve of power to give support to an energetic diplomacy - Charles's own opinion, in fact.

Swedish plenipotentiary 

Görtz’s position, however, was highly peculiar. Ostensibly, he was only the Holstein minister at Charles's court, in reality he was everything in Sweden except a Swedish subject - finance minister, plenipotentiary to foreign powers, factotum, and responsible to the king alone, though he had not a line of instructions. He was just the man for the time and his approach was revolutionary. His chief financial action was to debase the currency by issuing copper tokens, intended to be redeemable in better times; but it was no fault of his that Charles XII flung upon the market too great an amount of this money for Görtz to deal with. By the end of 1718 it seemed as if Görtz’s system could not go on much longer, and the hatred of the Swedes towards him was so intense and universal that they blamed him for Charles XII's tyranny as well as for his own. Görtz hoped, however, to conclude peace with at least some of Sweden’s numerous enemies before the crash came and then, by means of fresh combinations, to restore Sweden to her rank as a great power.

Downfall 
It is often said that in pursuit of his "system" Görtz displayed a genius for diplomacy which would have done honour to a Metternich or a Talleyrand. He desired peace with Russia first of all, and at the Congress of Åland even obtained relatively favourable terms, only to have them rejected by his stubbornly optimistic master. Simultaneously, Görtz was negotiating with Cardinal Alberoni and with the Whigs in England; but all his  combinations collapsed with the sudden death of Charles XII. The whole fury of the Swedish nation instantly fell upon Görtz. After a trial before a special commission, in which he was not permitted to have any legal assistance or the use of writing materials, he was condemned to decapitation and promptly executed. Though some historians argue that Görtz deserved his fate for "unnecessarily making himself the tool of an unheard-of despotism," his death is considered by other historians to be a judicial murder, and some historians even regard him as a political martyr.

References

1668 births
1719 deaths
People from the Duchy of Holstein
German diplomats
Swedish diplomats
University of Jena alumni
People executed by Sweden by decapitation
18th-century executions by Sweden
Executed German people
Executed people from Schleswig-Holstein